The Letaba River, also known as Leţaba, Lehlaba or Ritavi, is a river located in eastern Limpopo Province, South Africa. It is one of the most important tributaries of the Olifants River.

Course
It starts at the confluence of the Groot Letaba River and Klein Letaba River, whence they continue their journey eastwards through the Lowveld as the Letaba River. It joins the Olifants River in the foothills of the Lebombo Mountains, near South Africa's border with Mozambique. In Mozambique the latter river is called the Rio Elefantes.

Tributaries include the Middle Letaba River, Nharhweni River, Ngwenyeni River, Nwanedzi River, Molototsi River, Nsama River and Makhadzi River.

Dams in the basin
Ebenezer Dam
Tzaneen Dam
Modjaji Dam, in the Molototsi River
Hudson Ntsanwisi Dam, in the Nsama River
Middle Letaba Dam, in the Middle Letaba River
Engelhard Dam

See also
Luvubu and Letaba Water Management Area

References

Olifants River (Limpopo)
Rivers of Limpopo